Kenneth William Schrader (born May 29, 1955) is an American professional racing driver. He currently races on local dirt and asphalt tracks around the country while also competing part-time in the ARCA Menards Series, driving the No. 11 Ford for Fast Track Racing, and the Superstar Racing Experience, driving the No. 52 car. He previously competed in the NASCAR Cup Series, the NASCAR Xfinity Series, and the NASCAR Camping World Truck Series. He is a first cousin once removed of fellow NASCAR driver Carl Edwards.

He races in many racing divisions and has been successful in any division he has stepped into. He owns a dirt late model and dirt open-wheel modified car. Both of these cars, along with his Camping World Truck Series and ARCA series cars, are sponsored by Federated Auto Parts. He owns Federated Auto Parts Raceway (formerly I-55 Raceway) in Pevely, Missouri, and is co-owner of Macon Speedway, near Macon, Illinois, along with Kenny Wallace, Tony Stewart, and local promoter Bob Sargent.

During the 1990s and the early part of the 2000s, Schrader was running as many as 100 races among many types of racing, including NASCAR's national and regional touring series, ARCA, short track, and dirt track.

Racing career

Beginnings

Schrader was born in Fenton, Missouri. In 1971, he was the sportsmens champ at Lake Hill Speedway in Valley Park. That same year, he moved up to sprint cars, racing in various locations across the Midwest. In 1980, he started racing in USAC's Stock Car Division and was the series' rookie of the year. He returned to USAC's Stock Car Division one year later, finishing third in points. Early in the decade, he moved to the USAC series, competing in its various sprint car competitions. Schrader attempted to qualify for the 1983 Indianapolis 500 but wrecked his car during practice. In the USAC series, he won four USAC sprint car races, six Silver Crown races, 21 in USAC midgets, and 24 midget races in other divisions.

Schrader made his NASCAR debut in 1984 in the Cup Series, leasing out the No. 64 Ford normally owned and driven by Elmo Langley. He ran his first race at Nashville, qualifying 27th and finishing 19th in a 30-car field. He ran four more races out of the 64 that season, his best finish seventeenth at North Wilkesboro Speedway. In 1985, he signed to drive the No. 90 Ultra Seal-sponsored Ford for Junie Donlavey full-time. He had three 10th-place finishes and finished 16th in points, winning rookie of the year honors. In 1986, Red Baron Frozen Pizza became the team's new primary sponsor, and Schrader had four top 10s, including a best finish of seventh twice, and finished 16th in the standings in points for the second consecutive season. In 1987, Schrader won his first career pole, at the TranSouth 500, where he led 19 laps and finished fifth, his first top-five. He had nine other top 10s and finished 10th in the final standings. He also made his Busch Series debut, at North Carolina Speedway, finishing fifth in his own No. 45 Red Baron-sponsored Ford.

1988–1996: Hendrick Motorsports
In 1988, Schrader moved over to the No. 25 Folgers sponsored Chevrolet for Hendrick Motorsports. In his first race, he won the pole for the Daytona 500, beginning a three-year streak in which he won the pole for that race. After initially failing to qualify in the No. 25 for the following race, Schrader purchased a racecar from Buddy Arrington to drive in the No. 67 Ford, this time successfully qualifying. Schrader won his first career race, at the Talladega DieHard 500, and finished fifth in the final standings. He won his second career Cup race the following season at Charlotte Motor Speedway, and finished fifth in the standings again. He also earned his first career Busch Series win at the Ames/Peak 200.

Kodiak became Schrader's sponsor in 1990. Although he failed to win, he collected three poles, and seven top fives, dropping to 10th in points. In 1991, he got his third win, at the Motorcraft Quality Parts 500, and his final Winston Cup win, at Dover International Speedway. He had nine total top-five finishes and finished ninth in the final points standings. In 1992, he dropped to 17th in the standings after posting eleven top 10s. The following season, Schrader returned to ninth in the points and won a career-high six poles. He had his career-best points finish in 1994 when he finished fourth. He also won his most recent Busch race at Talladega.

In 1995, Budweiser became Schrader's primary sponsor. Schrader lost the top end of his left thumb in a mishap at Evergreen Speedway in a NASCAR Supertrucks practice session on May 13th. He won his final pole with Hendrick, at Pocono Raceway and dropped back to 17th in points. He survived a horrific crash in the DieHard 500 at Talladega Superspeedway. After he improved only to 12th in the standings in 1996, Schrader left Hendrick Motorsports after a nine-year association with the team.

1997–2005

In 1997, Schrader was hired to drive the No. 33 Skoal Bandit-sponsored Chevrolet Monte Carlo for Andy Petree Racing. He had eight top 10s and won two poles, finishing 10th in the standings, his most recent top 10 points finish. The following season, he posted three fourth-place finishes and won two poles over the last five races of the season. He won his final Cup pole, at Talladega, in 1999, but despite a 15th-place points run, Schrader failed to finish in the top five all year and departed Petree.

He signed to drive the No. 36 M&M's-sponsored Pontiac Grand Prix for MB2 Motorsports. In his first year of competition, Schrader had two top 10s and finished 18th in the standings. He posted five top 10s in 2001, but dropped to 19th in the standings. While competing in the Daytona 500, he was involved in a final-lap crash where Dale Earnhardt crashed into the wall and died. The image of Schrader peering into Earnhardt's car, only to jump back and frantically signal for assistance, is etched into the minds of many racing fans; his interview with Jeanne Zelasko during Fox Sports' post-race show was the first sign to many that something was wrong with the seven-time Winston Cup champion, as he appeared visibly shaken and upon being asked if Earnhardt was okay, he said "I don't really know. I'm not a doctor. I got the heck out of the way as soon as they got there." Schrader would later say in a 2011 interview that he knew Earnhardt was dead but didn't want to be the one to announce it. In 2002, Schrader did not finish in the top 10 in a single race, the first time since 1984. Following that season, he departed MB2.

Despite an original lack of sponsorship, Schrader was announced as the driver of the No. 49 BAM Racing Dodge Intrepid for 2003. Soon, 1-800-Call-ATT became the team's primary sponsor. At the Brickyard 400, Schrader's qualifying time was too slow (and the team was out of provisionals) to make the field, the first time since 1984 that Schrader had missed a Cup race. He DNQ'd three more times that season and fell to 36th in points. In 2004, Schrader's previous sponsor, Schwan Food Company, became BAM's new sponsor, while Schrader had a sixth-place finish at Bristol Motor Speedway. He had three more top 10s the following season and matched his previous year's run of 31st in points.

2006–2007

In 2006, Schrader drove the No. 21 Little Debbie/Motorcraft/United States Air Force-sponsored Ford for Wood Brothers Racing, earning his final two career top 10s that season. In 2007, he ran a part-time schedule with the Wood Brothers, sharing the ride with rookie Jon Wood. After the team fell out of the top 35 in owner's points, Bill Elliott became their new driver until the team returned to the top 35. Schrader returned to BAM Racing at Indianapolis, and later regained his spot with the Wood Brothers beginning at Loudon, before being replaced again by Elliott late in the year. Schrader also drove seventeen races in the Craftsman Truck Series for Bobby Hamilton Racing in the No. 18 Fastenal-sponsored Dodge Ram, earning two top-five finishes.

2008–2013

Schrader returned to BAM Racing in 2008. However, after making only two of the first five races, BAM Racing switched to Toyota. After the sixth race of the season, at Martinsville, Virginia where Schrader qualified the new Microsoft Toyota in seventh place and finished 37th, BAM Racing decided they needed to sit the next two races out to complete a fleet of the new Toyota cars. After two weeks, it was announced that a primary sponsor had backed out of its deal, leaving BAM Racing and Schrader with no other option but to temporarily suspend operations. NASCAR.com reported on April 15, 2008, that the team would not return to racing until the fall.  Schrader ran the race in a one-off at Talladega on April 27, 2008, in the No. 70 Haas/CNC Chevrolet, sponsored by Hunt Brothers Pizza, qualifying third, but finishing 42nd due to motor problems.

Schrader qualified a fourth Richard Childress Racing entry into the Coca-Cola 600 on May 25. He qualified the No. 33 Camping World sponsored Chevy in the 33rd position and finished 33rd.  Schrader signed a multi-race deal in August that allowed him to share a seat with Joey Logano for Jeff Moorad (Hall of Fame Racing) in the No. 96 DLP HDTV Toyota in various races through the end of the year. It was later announced that he would split the 2009 Cup schedule with Phoenix Racing's No. 09 car alongside Brad Keselowski, Sterling Marlin, and Mike Bliss, but never ran. He made two starts in the truck series for himself, and seven starts in the ARCA series with six top-tens in 2009.

Schrader started 14th and finished 14th in the Bud Shootout at Daytona International Speedway on February 6, 2010, driving the No. 82 Team Red Bull Toyota. That same year, he qualified for Martinsville marking his first Cup points race since the November 2008 event at Phoenix International Raceway.  Schrader finished 18th after starting 38th and leading seven laps for Latitude 43 Motorsports.

In 2011, Schrader ran a part-time Cup schedule for FAS Lane Racing. With seven starts, Schrader posted a season best finish of 21st at Martinsville during the fall race. He ran thirteen races for the team in the Sprint Cup Series in 2012. Schrader also inked a deal to run at least nine races in 2013 for FAS Lane Racing with Federated Auto Parts as the sponsor. Schrader ran in the truck series at the inaugural Mudsummer Classic at Eldora Speedway. He eventually finished 14th.

On May 21, 2013, he became the oldest ARCA race winner.

On October 27, 2013, Schrader announced that he would retire from NASCAR after the 2013 season; he described it as "not retirement", but that there were "just no plans to come back"; he planned to continue competing in ARCA and dirt modified events.

Despite his retirement, Schrader said he would drive an entry in the 2014 Truck race at Eldora. While he was originally entered in Haas Racing Development's No. 00 truck, he instead drove his own No. 52 Federated Auto Parts truck. Schrader finished fourth; his best NASCAR finish in several years. In the 2015 Mudsummer Classic, Schrader finished 11th after starting third. In the 2016 race, now known as the Aspen Dental Eldora Dirt Derby, he drove the No. 71 Chevrolet to 12th-place finish.

On May 27, 2017, Schrader entered into the Little 500 sprint car race held at Anderson Speedway in Anderson, Indiana, where he finished tenth. In July, he returned to the Eldora Truck race, driving the No. 66 Silverado for Bolen Motorsports.

SRX
On May 4, 2022, it was announced that Schrader would race in the Superstar Racing Experience at the track he owns, I-55 Speedway. Schrader won the first heat race of the night and finished 9th in heat 2. At the end of the main event, Schrader finished on the podium in 3rd.

Personal life
Schrader resides in Concord, North Carolina. He is married, to his wife, Ann. and they have two children.

Motorsports career results

NASCAR
(key) (Bold – Pole position awarded by qualifying time. Italics – Pole position earned by points standings or practice time. * – Most laps led.)

Sprint Cup Series

Daytona 500

Nationwide Series

Camping World Truck Series

Pinty's Series

* Season still in progress.

ARCA Menards Series
(key) (Bold – Pole position awarded by qualifying time. Italics – Pole position earned by points standings or practice time. * – Most laps led.)

 Season still in progress
 Ineligible for series points

International Race of Champions
(key) (Bold – Pole position. * – Most laps led.)

Superstar Racing Experience
(key) * – Most laps led. 1 – Heat 1 winner. 2 – Heat 2 winner.

References

External links

 
 
 

1955 births
Living people
American people of German descent
People from St. Louis County, Missouri
Racing drivers from Missouri
Racing drivers from St. Louis
NASCAR drivers
American Speed Association drivers
ARCA Menards Series drivers
Champ Car drivers
International Race of Champions drivers
NASCAR team owners
Motorsport announcers
Hendrick Motorsports drivers
Stewart-Haas Racing drivers
World of Outlaws drivers
ARCA Midwest Tour drivers
USAC Silver Crown Series drivers
USAC Stock Car drivers
A. J. Foyt Enterprises drivers
Chip Ganassi Racing drivers
Richard Childress Racing drivers